MCI Center is a  skyscraper in downtown Los Angeles, California, United States. It was completed in November, 1973 and has 33 floors. It is 32nd tallest building in Los Angeles. The Class A building has  of office space with a glass atrium and courtyard. On March 21, 2005 Jamison Properties bought the building for $150 per square foot totaling $101,770,500. This purchase included 925 West Eighth Street (originally known as the "Broadway Plaza" which became known as Macy's Plaza) and the 3,000 space parking garage. In 2013, the Ratkovich Company acquired the property, and after a redesign by Johnson Fain Architects, renamed the plaza “The Bloc.” Originally known for the fortress-like facade, the ground level was opened up and made more pedestrian friendly by removing the original brick walls and the glass atrium. The redevelopment features a below grade open public plaza that directly connects to the 7th Street / Metro Center Station. This is the first direct underground connection of a private development to a subway station on Metro's system.

Metrolink at one time had its headquarters in the MCI Center. In June 2011, Metrolink moved its headquarters to the Los Angeles County Metropolitan Transportation Authority (LACMTA) headquarters at 1 Gateway Plaza at Los Angeles Union Station.

The offices of La Opinión are in Suites 3000 and 3100, while ImpreMedia Digital has its offices in Suite 3000.

In popular culture
 Interiors are prominently featured in the 1974 disaster film, Earthquake as the fictional "Wilson Plaza", a field hospital set up after a major earthquake destroys Los Angeles.  Filming was done over two nights in March, 1974, and centered mainly around the atrium plaza area, and the escalators on the Sheraton Hotel entrance to the building.  Used for many other film and television productions as well, including The Rockford Files, Rollercoaster, and Marathon Man.

See also

List of tallest buildings in Los Angeles

References

Skyscraper office buildings in Los Angeles
Buildings and structures in Downtown Los Angeles
Verizon Communications
Office buildings completed in 1973
1973 establishments in California
1970s architecture in the United States
MCI Communications